Prof. Marwan Awartani was born in Anabta town east of Tulkarm Governorate, Palestine on April 21, 1949. Dr. Awartani has become one of the leaders in innovative thinking and education development and education reform in the Middle East. Prof. Awartani was the Acting President of Al-Quds University in Jerusalem, Secretary General of the Universal Education Foundation and is the Chairman of the Arab Foundations Forum. Prof. Awartani is the President of the Palestinian Society for Mathematical Sciences, and Founding President of Alpha International, and the president of Palestine Technical University-Khadoorie in Tulkarem-west Bank. Now he is the Minister for Education and Higher Education.

Education
Ph.D. "Topology" 1980. Lehigh University, Bethlehem, Pennsylvania, U.S.A. "Classification of discontinuities of real functions".
M.Sc. "Topology" 1978. Lehigh University, Bethlehem, Pennsylvania, U.S.A.
B.Sc. "Mathematics" 1973. American University of Beirut, Lebanon.

References

External links
Uef-eba.org
Home.birzeit.edu
Alpha.ps
Synergos.org

1949 births
Living people
People from Anabta
Academic staff of Al-Quds University
Government ministers of the State of Palestine
Academic staff of Palestine Technical University
21st-century Palestinian people
Presidents of the Palestine Academy for Science and Technology